Lliçà d'Amunt, or Llissá de Munt, is a municipality in Vallès Oriental, Catalonia, Spain.

References

External links
 Government data pages 

Municipalities in Vallès Oriental